Joaquín García may refer to:

Arts and entertainment
Joaquín García de Antonio (1710–1779), Spanish composer
Joaquín García Monge (1881–1958), Costa Rican novelist
Joaquín Riquelme García (born 1983), Spanish viola soloist

Sports
Chano García (Joaquín García, born 1903), Cuban baseball player
Nito (footballer, born 1933) (Joaquín García Paredes, born 1933), Spanish footballer
Joaquín García Benavides (born 1962), Costa Rican slalom canoer
Joaquín García (footballer, born 1986), Spanish footballer
Joaquín García (footballer, born 1875), Spanish footballer

Others
Joaquín García (politician) (fl. 1829–1839), governor of Nuevo León
Joaquín García Icazbalceta (1824–1894), Mexican philologist and historian
Joaquín García Borrero (1894–1948), Colombian engineer, politician, senator, historian and writer
Joaquín García Morato (1904–1939), Nationalist fighter ace of the Spanish Civil War
Joaquín "Jack" García (born 1952), Cuban-American retired FBI agent